The Dharmarajeshwara temple is a rock-cut temple site 100kms from Mandsaur in Madhya Pradesh, India. The complex features well-preserved Buddhist caves as well as a Hindu shrine and bears some resemblance to the rock-cut heritage sites at Ellora, Maharashtra.

The temple complex dates to the 8th century and initially featured a shrine dedicated to Vishnu but was later remodelled as a Shiva temple. Consequently, the sanctum sanctorum features both an icon of Harihara as well as a Shivalinga. The Mahashivaratri is the primary festival celebrated at Dharmarajeshwara.

Picture gallery

References 

Temples in Madhya Pradesh
Tourist attractions in Mandsaur district
Caves of Madhya Pradesh
Buddhist temples in India
History of Madhya Pradesh
5th century in India
Buddhist caves in India